Tahir Pasha Mahmud Bey-zade (1711–18) was an Ottoman governor (mutasarrıf), the sanjak-bey of Dukakin (or İpek). In 1711, he and his nephew Ahmed fought at the Moldavian battlefield. In 1717 to 18, he was appointed by the government to deal with the rebellious Serb rayah in the Sanjak of Vučitrn (see Uprising in Vučitrn).

References

Governors of the Ottoman Empire
18th-century people from the Ottoman Empire
Ottoman period in the history of Kosovo
18th-century deaths
17th-century births
Military personnel from Peja
Austro-Turkish War (1716–1718)